Gaëtan Englebert (born 11 June 1976) is a Belgian former footballer who played as a defensive midfielder, and the current director of football of RFC Liège.

Club career
Born in Liège, Englebert started playing professionally with local club RFC Liège after spending nearly one decade in its youth system. In 1997, after one season, he moved to K. Sint-Truidense VV, where he made his Pro League debuts.

Two years later Englebert signed for Club Brugge KV, being one of the club's most important midfield members during his eight-year spell as it won, amongst other accolades, two leagues and three cups. Overall, he appeared in 344 matches and scored 26 goals.

At already 32, Englebert would have his first experience abroad, signing a two-year deal with Tours FC of Ligue 2, in June 2008. On 31 August 2010, choosing to stay in the category, he moved to FC Metz.

In July 2011, Englebert returned to his country and joined third level side K.V.V. Coxyde. In the following transfer window he returned to Liège, where he played until 2013; he continued working with the latter club after retiring, as its director of football.

International career
Englebert collected nine caps for Belgium, the first one arriving on 28 February 2001 as the Red Devils thrashed San Marino for the 2002 FIFA World Cup qualifiers (10–1 in Brussels).

The national side made it to the final stages in South Korea and Japan and the player – following another solid season at Brugges – was picked for the 23-man squad, but he did not leave the bench.

Honours
Sint-Truiden
 Belgian League Cup: 1999

Club Brugge
 Belgian First Division: 2002–03, 2004–05
 Belgian Cup: 2001–02, 2003–04, 2006–07; runners-up: 2004–05
 Belgian Supercup: 2002, 2003, 2004, 2005
 Bruges Matins: 2000, 2001, 2004, 2006, 2007
 Jules Pappaert Cup: 2005

Belgium
 FIFA Fair Play Trophy: 2002 World Cup

References

External links
 
 Club Brugge archives 
 National team data
 
 
 
 

1976 births
Living people
Footballers from Liège
Belgian footballers
Association football midfielders
Belgian Pro League players
Challenger Pro League players
RFC Liège players
Sint-Truidense V.V. players
Club Brugge KV players
Ligue 2 players
Tours FC players
FC Metz players
Belgium international footballers
Belgium under-21 international footballers
2002 FIFA World Cup players
Belgian expatriate footballers
Belgian expatriate sportspeople in France
Expatriate footballers in France